Walker Glenn "Bill" "Big Six" Carpenter (June 3, 1893 – September 24, 1956) was an American football tackle for John Heisman's Georgia Tech Golden Tornado of the Georgia Institute of Technology. He and teammate Everett Strupper were the first players from the Deep South selected to an All-America team, in 1917. Carpenter was inducted into the Georgia Tech Athletics Hall of Fame in 1965. He is also a member of the Georgia Sports Hall of Fame and  the Helms Football Hall of Fame.

Personal
Walker was born June 3, 1893 in Newnan, Georgia to Starling V. Carpenter and Glenn L. Camp. He was the father of American educator and university administrator Thomas Glenn Carpenter.

Georgia Tech
Carpenter entered The Georgia Institute of Technology in the fall of 1914, elected president of the freshman class. He graduated from Tech with a degree in mechanical engineering.

Football
His coach John Heisman once said of Carpenter: "On three of Georgia Tech's greatest teams Bill Carpenter—Big Six—played right tackle in the manner that makes coaches believe that life is good. Even the coaches of the teams we walloped were given to saying that it was worth a beating to watch Bill." He was nominated though not selected for an Associated Press All-Time Southeast 1869-1919 era team.

1914 and 1915
His first year on the football team saw Carpenter suffer a serious injury during the Georgia game which caused him to have one of his kidneys removed. It was wondered if he would ever play football again. Carpenter defied the odds and stepped out on the field for the first game of 1915 against Mercer.

1916
Carpenter would be a starter the next year for the famous 222–0 defeat of Cumberland in 1916

1917
He was captain of one of Tech's greatest teams in 1917, winning a national championship and outscoring opponents 491–17. He was responsible that year for training new recruits Si Bell, Bill Fincher, and Dan Whelchel.

References

1893 births
1956 deaths
People from Newnan, Georgia
Sportspeople from the Atlanta metropolitan area
Players of American football from Georgia (U.S. state)
American football ends
American football tackles
Georgia Tech Yellow Jackets football players
All-Southern college football players
Track and field athletes from Georgia (U.S. state)
Georgia Tech Yellow Jackets men's track and field athletes